The 2001 Kremlin Cup men's singles was a professional tennis competition. Yevgeny Kafelnikov was the defending champion and won in the final 6–4, 7–5 against Nicolas Kiefer.

Seeds

Draw

Finals

Top half

Bottom half

See also
Association of Tennis Professionals
History of tennis

References

External links
 Draw

Kremlin Cup
Kremlin Cup